Adam Pearlman (born 5 April 2005) is a professional soccer player who plays as a defender for Toronto FC II in MLS Next Pro. Born in South Africa, he has been called up to Canada at youth international level.

Early life
Born in South Africa, Pearlman began playing soccer at age four with Highlands Park. In 2012, he moved to Thornhill, Ontario, Canada with his family, when he was seven, and joined Glen Shields SC, and later Future Soccer Academy. In October 2016, he joined the Toronto FC Academy, playing across the U12 to U19 levels and also participated in the 2018 U13 CONCACAF Champions League.

Club career
He played with Toronto FC III in the League1 Ontario Summer Championship in 2021.

On 8 April 2022, he signed a professional contract with Toronto FC II in MLS Next Pro. He made his debut on 10 April against New York City FC II.

On 15 April 2022, he signed a short-term four-day loan with the first team, Toronto FC, ahead of their Major League Soccer match against the Philadelphia Union, but was an unused substitute. He signed additional short-term agreements on 14 May and 24 May. He was named to the East roster for the 2022 MLS Next All-Star Game for MLS U18 Academy prospects.

International career
In December 2021, he was invited to a camp for the Canada U20 team in January 2022, however the camp was cancelled due to a rise in the COVID-19 pandemic. On 13 May 2022 Pearlman was named to the 60-man provisional Canada U20 team for the 2022 CONCACAF U-20 Championship, and in June was named to the extended five-man training squad for the team.

Career statistics

Club

References

2005 births
Living people
Canadian soccer players
South African soccer players
Canadian people of South African descent
South African emigrants to Canada
Association football defenders
Toronto FC players
Toronto FC II players
MLS Next Pro players
Soccer players from Johannesburg
People from Thornhill, Ontario